Decennatherium is an extinct genus of giraffids. It was first named by Crusafont Pairo in 1952. It was only found at the Macrofauna, Los Valles de Fuentidueña fossil site in Segovia, Spain.

References

External links 
 Decennatherium at the Paleobiology Database

Prehistoric giraffes
Prehistoric even-toed ungulate genera
Fossil taxa described in 1952
Taxa named by Miquel Crusafont i Pairó